Nicolae Ștefănuță is a Romanian politician of Greens who has been serving as a Member of the European Parliament since 2019.

Political career
In parliament, Ștefănuță serves on the Committee on Budgets and on the Committee on the Environment, Public Health and Food Safety. In 2020, he also joined the Special Committee on Beating Cancer. Ștefănuță has been serving as the parliament’s lead rapporteur on the budget of the European Union for 2023.

In addition to his committee assignments, Ștefănuță is part of the parliament's delegation for relations with the United States. He co-chairs the informal MEP Interest Group on Antimicrobial Resistance (AMR). He is also a member of the European Parliament Intergroup on Climate Change, Biodiversity and Sustainable Development, the European Parliament Intergroup on LGBT Rights, the European Parliament Intergroup on Children’s Rights and the European Parliament Intergroup on Traditional Minorities, National Communities and Languages.

Political positions
In 2021, Ștefănuță joined seven other Romanian MEPs in co-signing a letter to Ursula von der Leyen and Maroš Šefčovič in which they call on the European Commission to stop the United Kingdom from holding EU nationals in immigration removal centers.

References

Living people
MEPs for Romania 2019–2024
The Greens–European Free Alliance MEPs
Save Romania Union MEPs
Save Romania Union politicians
Year of birth missing (living people)